Robin Birley may refer to:
 Robin Birley (archaeologist) (1935–2018), English archaeologist
 Robin Birley (businessman) (born 1958), English businessman and political activist